Hunnu Air operates services to the following scheduled destinations: (as of June 2019)

List

References

Hunnu Air